Machine Sazi Tabriz Co. (Tabriz Machinery Manufacturing Co.) which is also called by its abbreviation MST, is a Machine tool manufacturing factory in Tabriz, Iran. The major products of the factory are machinery tools such as turning machines, milling machines, drilling machines, grinding machines. A large variety of MST's products are CNC controlled machines. The MST manufacturing complex established on 1969 with technological helps from east European countries. The MST serves as a nationwide base for design and manufacturing of machine tools. MST owns the Machine Sazi football club, since 1969 to now.

References

Manufacturing companies established in 1967
Machine tool builders
Manufacturing companies of Iran
Economy of Iranian Azerbaijan
Iranian brands
Iranian companies established in 1967